INS Mumbai is the third of the  guided-missile destroyers in active service with the Indian Navy.

Mumbai was built at Mazagon Dock Limited in her namesake city Mumbai, launched in 1995, and commissioned in 2001. As of May 2022,the ship is undergoing mid life upgrade same as her sister ship INS Delhi (D61).

The ship's crest depicts the gateway entrance to INS Angre (named as such in honour of Admiral Kanhoji Angre). The gateway has a watch tower with three look-out posts and stands against the backdrop of the ramparts of the fort. Two Ghurabs (or Grabs), depicted on either side of the fort, signify the seafaring traditions of the Marathas. INS Mumbai has been the Flagship for various combat operations like Op Parakram and many Humanitarian Assistance and Disaster Relief (HADR) operations

Operations

Operation Sukoon
In July 2006, Mumbai was part of Task Force 54, on its way back to India from the Mediterranean, when the Israel-Lebanon conflict broke out. Mumbai was redeployed to assist the evacuation of Indian citizens from Lebanon as a part of Operation Sukoon.

Operation Raahat
For this operation, the ship's commanding officer Captain Rajesh Dhankar was awarded the Nao Sena Medal for gallantry.

References

External links

See also
 

 

Delhi-class destroyers
Destroyers of the Indian Navy
Ships built in India
1995 ships
Destroyers of India